

The Oecophorinae are the nominate subfamily of moths in the concealer moth family (Oecophoridae). They are part of the insufficiently studied superfamily Gelechioidea, and like their relatives, the circumscription of this taxon is disputed.

History of classification
In some approaches, the Oecophoridae are expanded to include several lineages formerly placed in the Elachistidae or considered independent gelechioid families. As regards the Oecophorinae, the proposed concealer moth subfamilies Chimabachinae, Deuterogoniinae, Peleopodinae and Philobotinae were included here pending further study of the affiliations of their genera. They were also often treated as independent families (Chimabachidae, Deuterogoniidae, Peleopodidae and Philobotidae) by those who followed a "splitting" approach. In general, the delimitation of the Oecophorinae versus the Amphisbatinae, Depressariinae and Hypertrophinae has been the most contested issue, though the uncertain placement of the Xyloryctidae versus the concealer moths (into which they might belong as subfamily) has also been a considerable stumbling block.

Numerous attempts have been made to divide the Oecophorinae into tribes, such as Carcinini, Crossotocerini, Denisiini, Herrichini, Oecophorini, Peleopodini and Pleurotini. Also placed here under this scheme are the Cacochroini and Orophiini, which otherwise were included in the Depressariinae (but usually only when these were elevated to full family rank). Most of the proposed tribes were based on phenetic or qualitative analyses, if not merely on the whim of the entomologists that established them, and no robust evolutionary scenario has been established for the different lineages of Oecophorinae. The groups around the genus Peleopoda (the former Peleopodinae) and of course the type genus Oecophora are generally recognized to be well distinguished from each other, but no satisfying arrangement has been found for the bulk of the (presumed) oecophorine genera. Hence, no subdivision into tribes is attempted here.

Taxonomy and systematics

The following genera (with some notable species also listed) are usually held to belong to the Oecophorinae. Still, placement of few genera is completely certain (see above), and many – in particular monotypic genera – may not be valid at all. New oecophorine genera are also being described frequently:
Tribe Oecophorini
Bisigna Toll, 1956
Brymblia Hodges, 1974
Fabiola Busck, 1908
Endrosis Hübner, [1825]
Hofmannophila Spuler, 1910
Schiffermuelleria Hübner, [1825]
Buvatina Leraut, 1984
Denisia Hübner, [1825]
Eratophyes Diakonoff, 1975
Goidanichiana Agenjo, 1977
Decantha Busck, 1908
Inga Busck, 1908
Metalampra Toll, 1956
Eido Chambers, 1873
Carolana Clarke, 1941
Borkhausenia Hübner, [1825]
Herrichia Staudinger, 1871
Kasyniana Vives, 1986
Crassa Bruand, 1851
Batia Stephens, 1834
Epicallima Dyar, [1903]
Esperia Hübner, [1825]
Polix Hodges, 1974
Mathildana Clarke, 1941
Oecophora Latreille, [1796]
Alabonia Hübner, [1825]
Harpella Schrank, 1802
Cyphacma Meyrick, 1915
Callimodes Leraut, 1989
Dasycera Stephens, 1829
Paradasycera Lvovsky & Sinev, 2011
Pseudocryptolechia Lvovsky, 2001
Ymeldia Hodges, 1965
Tribe Metachandini Meyrick, 1911
Metachanda Meyrick, 1911
Tribe Crossotocerini Lvovsky, 2002
Crossotocera Zerny in Wagner, 1930
Tribe Periacmini Lvovsky, 2005
Periacma Meyrick, 1894
Irepacma Moriuti, Saito & Lewvanich, 1985
Ripeacma Moriuti, Saito & Lewvanich, 1985
Epiracma Wang & Li, 2005
Unplaced
Abychodes Viette, 1954
Acartophila Meyrick, 1922
Achyrostola Meyrick, 1921
Acriotes Diakonoff, 1954
Acmotoma Common, 1994
Aechmioides Bruand, 1851
Aeolernis Meyrick, 1914
Agrioplecta Meyrick in Caradja & Meyrick, 1935
Agroecodes Meyrick, 1937
Aidabella Urra, 2014
Aliciana Clarke, 1978
Alomenarcha Meyrick, 1930
Altiura Clarke, 1978
Alynda Clarke, 1978
Amphipseustis Meyrick, 1921
Amseloecia Povolný, 1983
Anacathartis Meyrick, 1927
Anacoemastis Meyrick, 1914
Ancylometis Meyrick, 1887
Aniuta Clarke, 1978
Arctopoda Butler, 1883
Arctoscelis Meyrick, 1894
Areocosma Meyrick, 1917
Ashinaga Matsumura, 1929
Astiarcha Meyrick, 1914
Atha Clarke, 1978
Atopophrictis Meyrick, 1920
Atopotorna Meyrick, 1932
Aulotropha Meyrick, 1918
Beforona Viette, 1956
Bigotianella Legrand, 1965
Briarostoma Meyrick, 1920
Calliphractis Meyrick, 1928
Cecidolechia Kieffer & Jörgensen, 1910
Cenarchis Meyrick, 1924
Ceranthes Meyrick, 1918
Chalcorectis Meyrick, 1937
Chanystis Meyrick, 1911
Choronoma Meyrick, 1926
Colpomorpha Meyrick, 1929
Compsistis Meyrick, 1888
Corita Clarke, 1978
Crystallogenes Meyrick, 1937
Deia Clarke, 1978
Delonoma Meyrick, 1914
Delosaphes Meyrick in Caradja & Meyrick, 1938
Despina Clarke, 1978
Diocosma Meyrick, 1909
Diploclasis Diakonoff, [1968]
Dita Clarke, 1978
Doliotechna Meyrick, 1914
Doxomeres Meyrick, 1917
Dysgnorima Zeller, 1877
Eclactistis Meyrick, 1913
Elaphrerga Meyrick, 1922
Eomichla Meyrick, 1916
Eonympha Meyrick, 1906
Epimecyntis Meyrick, 1924
Epiphractis Meyrick, 1908
Eraina Clarke, 1978
Erotis Meyrick, 1910
Eucleodora Walsingham, 1881
Euhylecoetes Diakonoff, 1954
Euzelotica Diakonoff, 1954
Exosphrantis Meyrick, 1931
Formokamaga Matsumura, 1931
Gildita Beéche, 2014
Glorita Urra, 2013
Goniorrhostis Meyrick in de Joannis, 1930
Halimarmara Meyrick, 1931
Haploscopa Meyrick, 1939
Hednophora Meyrick, 1911
Heliostibes Zeller, 1874
Heloscopa Diakonoff, 1955
Heringiana Hayward, 1967
Homoplastis Meyrick, 1926
Hyperskeles Butler, 1883
Hypersymmoca Chrétien, 1917
Irenia Clarke, 1978
Isocrita Meyrick, 1909
Lactistica Meyrick, 1907
Langastis Meyrick, 1914
Lasiochira Meyrick in Caradja & Meyrick, 1935
Lasiomactra Meyrick, 1921
Lelita Clarke, 1978
Lepidechidna Meyrick, 1934
Letogenes Meyrick, 1921
Loxozyga Meyrick in Caradja & Meyrick, 1938
Lygronoma Meyrick, 1913
Macarocosma Meyrick, 1931
Macrosaces Meyrick, 1905
Melochrysis Meyrick, 1916
Meloteles Meyrick, 1920
Mesothyrsa Meyrick, 1910
Mimopictes Turati, 1924
Nagehana Özdikmen, 2009
Nymphostola Meyrick, 1883
Pseudoecophora Staudinger, 1899
Promalactis Meyrick, 1908
Ocyphron Meyrick, 1921
Odonna Clarke, 1982
Opsigenes Meyrick, 1918
Orygocera Walsingham, 1897
Oxycharis Meyrick, 1939
Oxycrates Meyrick, 1930
Oxyscopa Meyrick, 1926
Pachyphoenix Butler, 1883
Paradeuterogonia Saito, 1989
Parapleuris Meyrick, 1937.
Parodaea Meyrick, 1914
Pedioxestis Meyrick, 1932
Pelocharella T. B. Fletcher, 1940
Perilachna Meyrick, 1914
Phaulolechia Diakonoff, 1951
Philametris Meyrick, 1924
Philarga Meyrick, 1918
Philomusaea Meyrick, 1931
Phratriodes Meyrick, 1926
Picrogenes Meyrick, 1917
Picrotechna Meyrick, 1914
Plasmatica Meyrick, 1914
Platactis Meyrick, 1911
Pleurotopsis Amsel, 1955
Porthmologa Meyrick, 1914
Proteodes Meyrick, 1883
Protochanda Meyrick in Caradja & Meyrick, 1935
Protonostoma Meyrick, 1910
Psaltica Meyrick, 1905
Pseudepiphractis Viette, 1956
Pseudodoxia Durrant, 1895
Pseudoprotasis Walsingham, 1897
Pycnotarsa Meyrick, 1920
Pyrophractis Meyrick, 1930
Quelita Beéche, 2013
Revonda Clarke, 1978
Rhoecoptera Meyrick, 1909
Secitis Meyrick, 1928
Selidoris Meyrick, 1926
Semnocosma Meyrick, 1924
Sphenaspella T. B. Fletcher, 1940
Stasixena Meyrick, 1930
Stereodytis Meyrick, 1914
Stereoptila Meyrick, 1917
Struthoscelis Meyrick, 1913
Tanyarches Meyrick, 1924
Tanychastis Meyrick, 1910
Taragmarcha Meyrick, 1910
Taruda Walker, 1864
Teratopsis Walsingham, 1881
Teresita Clarke, 1978
Terthrotica Meyrick, 1914
Thamnocrana Meyrick, 1927
Thaumatolita Walsingham, 1912
Theatrocopia Walsingham, 1897
Therapnis Meyrick, 1910
Thyestarcha Meyrick, 1912
Tinoecophora Amsel, 1968
Trachypepla Meyrick, 1883
Triptologa Meyrick, 1914
Tyriograptis Meyrick, 1934
Tyrolimnas Meyrick, 1934
Tyromantis Meyrick, 1918
Utilia Clarke, 1978
Variacma Wang, 2006
Xenomicta Meyrick, 1914
Xenophanta Meyrick, 1914
Xheroctys Viette, 1954
Xylesthes Diakonoff, 1954
Zulemita Urra, 2013
Zygolopha Meyrick, 1914
Zymrina Clarke, 1978
Hierodoris group
Athrotaxivora McQuillan, 1998
Gymnobathra Meyrick, 1883
Hierodoris Meyrick, 1912
Izatha Walker, 1864
Lathicrossa Meyrick, 1883
Nemotyla Nielsen, McQuillan & Common, 1992
Phaeosaces Meyrick, 1885
Thamnosara Meyrick, 1883
Tinearupa Salmon & Bradley, 1956
Scieropepla Meyrick, 1886
Wingia group
Acanthodela Common, 1994
Acorotricha Meyrick, 1913
Ageletha Common, 1994
Ancistromorpha Common, 1994
Anthocoma Turner, 1946
Antipterna Meyrick, 1916
Arachnographa Meyrick, 1914
Archaereta Meyrick, 1914
Atelosticha Meyrick, 1883
Baiocystis Common, 1994
Basiplecta Common, 1994
Bathrosterra Common, 1994
Brachynemata Meyrick, 1883
Callimima Turner, 1935
Catacometes Common, 1994
Chrysonoma Meyrick, 1914
Coeranica Meyrick, 1883
Compsotropha Meyrick, 1883
Coryphoscola Common, 1994
Cosmaresta Common, 1994
Crepidosceles Meyrick, 1883
Deigmoesta Common, 1994
Diaphorodes Turner, 1946
Echinobasis Common, 1994
Elaphromorpha Turner, 1936
Endeolena Common, 1994
Enoplidia Common, 1994
Eochrois Meyrick, 1886
Epicurica Meyrick, 1914
Eremnotypa Common, 1994
Ericibdela Common, 1994
Euchaetis Meyrick, 1883
Euphiltra Meyrick, 1883
Euthictis Meyrick, 1914
Garrha Walker, 1866
Habroscopa Meyrick, 1914
Hadrocheta Common, 1994
Hapaloteucha Meyrick, 1914
Heliocausta Meyrick, 1883
Hemibela Turner, 1894
Heteroptolis Meyrick, 1914
Heteroteucha Common, 1994
Hoplomorpha Turner, 1916
Hybocrossa Turner, 1917
Idioxantha Common, 1994
Idiozancla Turner, 1936
Ironopolia Common, 1994
Lamproxantha Common, 1994
Lepidotarsa Meyrick, 1883
Leucorhabda Common, 1994
Limothnes Turner, 1935
Linosticha Meyrick, 1883
Liocnema Turner, 1941
Lophopepla Turner, 1896
Mionolena Common, 1994
Myrascia Common, 1977
Ocystola Meyrick, 1885
Oligoloba Common, 1994
Orthiastis Meyrick, 1914
Paneutricha Common, 1994
Parocystola Turner, 1896
Phauloplana Common, 2000
Phyllophanes Turner, 1896
Phytotrypa Common, 1994
Piloprepes Meyrick, 1883
Placocosma Meyrick, 1883
Platyphylla Turner, 1946
Plectobela Common, 1994
Plesiosticha Meyrick, 1921
Poliorhabda Common, 1994
Polyeucta Turner, 1917
Prionocris Common, 1994
Prodelaca Common, 1994
Psaltriodes Meyrick, 1902
Psaroxantha Common, 1994
Ptyoptila Turner, 1946
Pycnozancla Turner, 1917
Rhadinoloba Common, 1994
Saphezona Common, 1994
Sclerocheta Common, 1994
Scotodryas Turner, 1932
Stereoloba Common, 1994
Stictochila Common, 1994
Syringoseca Common, 1994
Tanyzancla Meyrick, 1918
Thalerotricha Meyrick, 1883
Tortricopsis Newman, 1856
Trachyzancla Turner, 1917
Wingia Walsingham in Walsingham & Durrant, 1900
Zacorus Butler, 1882
Zelotechna Meyrick, 1914
Zonopetala Meyrick, 1883
Chezala group
Acantholena Common, 1997
Acedesta Turner, 1940
Aeolothapsa Common, 1997
Allognoma Common, 1997
Anomozancla Turner, 1936
Artiastis Meyrick, 1889
Ascetoloba Common, 1997
Ataleida Common, 2000
Atholosticta Common, 1997
Boroscena Common, 1997
Brachyzancla Turner, 1936
Chezala Walker, 1864
Cnecophora Common in Nielsen & Rangsi, 1996
Coesyra Meyrick, 1883
Conobrosis Common, 1997
Cryptotypa Common, 1997
Delexocha Common, 1997
Diapatela Common, 1997
Disselia Meyrick, 1883
Dissoloba Common, 1997
Drepanocera Common, 1997
Enchronista Meyrick, 1914
Epithymema Turner, 1914
Ericrypsina Common, 1997
Erythrisa Common, 1997
Hadrognatha Common, 1997
Hesperoptila Meyrick, 1902
Heterozyga Meyrick, 1883
Ioptera Meyrick, 1883
Leistomorpha Meyrick, 1883
Merocroca Common, 1997
Nephogenes Meyrick, 1883
Notodryas Meyrick, 1897
Olbonoma Meyrick, 1914
Olenacantha Common, 1997
Oxythecta Meyrick, 1883
Pantogymna Common, 1997
Pararsia Turner, 1939
Pelinoema Common, 1997
Pellopsis Common, 1997
Periorycta Meyrick, 1922
Phauloglossa Common, 1997
Phloeocetis Turner, 1936
Phloeograptis Meyrick, 1904
Phryganeutis Meyrick, 1884
Platoloncha Common, 1997
Prepalla Common, 1997
Proteromicta Meyrick, 1889
Pseudotheta Clarke, 1947
Pycnocera Turner, 1896
Satrapia Meyrick, 1883
Scatochresis Common, 1997
Stictopolia Common, 1997
Tachystola Meyrick, 1914
Tanycaula Common, 1997
Telanepsia Turner, 1933
Thema Walker, 1864
Trichomoeris Meyrick, 1913
Philobota group
Diplogephyra Common, 1997
Echinocosma Common, 1997
Eusemocosma Common, 1997
Gymnocoila Common, 1997
Haplodyta Meyrick, 1883
Isomoralla Common, 1997
Microbela Meyrick, 1883
Palimmeces Turner, 1916
Parergophela Common, 1997
Philobota Meyrick, Apr. 1883
Prepocosma Common, 1997
Stereocheta Common, 1997
Telocharacta Common, 1997
Eulechria group
Acolasta Meyrick, 1902
Aristeis Meyrick, 1884
Atheropla Meyrick, 1883
Diplogrypa Common, 1997
Eulechria Meyrick, 1883
Hoplostega Meyrick, 1914
Pachybela Turner, 1917
Petalanthes Meyrick, 1883
Ptochosaris Meyrick, 1906
Sclerocris Common, 1997
Temnogyropa Common, 1997
Barea group
Airogephyra Common, 2000
Analcodes Turner, 1947
Ancharcha Meyrick, 1920
Antiopala Meyrick, 1889
Aspasiodes Turner, 1944
Atalopsis Common, 2000
Atomotricha Meyrick, 1883
Baioglossa Common, 2000
Barea Walker, 1864
Casmara Walker, 1863
Catadoceta Common, 2000
Chersadaula Meyrick, 1923
Cirrograpta Common, 2000
Cirromitra Common, 2000
Coelognatha Common, 2000
Corocosma Meyrick, 1927
Delophanes Turner, 1947
Diaphanta Common, 1996
Diocrogephyra Common, 2000
Dolopsis Common, 2000
Dysthreneta Turner, 1947
Echinognatha Common, 2000
Elaeonoma Meyrick, 1914
Enlopholepis Common, 2000
Ereiconastes Common, 2000
Eremnozona Common, 2000
Erythrobapta Common, 2000
Euchersadaula Philpott, 1926
Eucryphaea Turner, 1935
Eulachna Meyrick, 1883
Exarsia Meyrick, 1914
Guestia Meyrick, 1889
Habrochlanis Common, 2000
Hesperenoeca Common, 2000
Lasiocosma Common, 2000
Laxonoma Meyrick, 1914
Leimmatonca Common, 2000
Leipochlida Common, 2000
Leprocosma Common, 2000
Leptocroca Meyrick, 1883
Liozancla Turner, 1919
Locheutis Meyrick, 1883
Machaeritis Meyrick, 1883
Machetis Meyrick, 1883
Macronemata Meyrick, 1883
Macrophara Turner, 1946
Meioglossa Common, 2000
Melanoima Common, 2000
Mermeristis Meyrick, 1915
Metaphrastis Meyrick, 1907
Micramicta Common, 2000
Micropeteina Common, 2000
Mimobrachyoma Lower, 1902
Neosigala Turner, 1917
Ochropolia Common, 2000
Ochyrolopha Common, 2000
Oncolapara Common, 2000
Oncomerista Common, 2000
Opsitycha Meyrick, 1914
Orescoa Turner, 1927
Oresitropha Turner, 1927
Ozotrypetes Common, 2000
Pachyceraia Common, 2000
Periallactis Meyrick, 1902
Phloioletes Common, 2000
Phriconyma Meyrick, 1883
Protomacha Meyrick, 1883
Psarophorca Common, 2000
Pyrgoptila Meyrick, 1889
Rhoecoceros Turner, 1940
Saropla Meyrick, 1883
Scalideutis Meyrick, 1906
Scoliocheta Common, 2000
Sphyrelata Meyrick, 1883
Stenoptena Common, 2000
Sympoecila Common, 2000
Syncometes Common, 2000
Syscalma Meyrick, 1920
Thapsinotypa Common, 2000
Trachyntis Meyrick, 1889
Triacra Common, 2000
Trinaconeura Turner, 1933
Trisyntopa Lower, 1918
Tisobarica group
Aglaodes Turner, 1898
Callithauma Turner, 1900
Tisobarica Walker, 1864
Unnamed group
Aeolocosma Meyrick, 1880
Ancistroneura Turner, 1947
Chioneocephala Common, 2000
Clonitica Meyrick, 1914
Clymene Chambers, 1873
Copidostola Lower, 1897
Corethropalpa Turner, 1896
Corynotricha Common, 2000
Crossophora Meyrick, 1883
Diasceta Common, 2000
Eridolera Common, 2000
Joonggoora Lucas, 1901
Leptocopa Meyrick, 1918
Leurophanes Turner, 1939
Lonchoptena Common, 2000
Microlocha Meyrick, 1914
Nemepeira Common, 2000
Ochlogenes Meyrick, 1883
Oenochroa Meyrick, 1883
Pauronota Lower, 1901
Pholeutis Meyrick, 1906
Teerahna Lucas, 1901
Trachyxysta Meyrick, 1916
Woorda Lucas, 1901
Wullaburra Lucas, 1901
Zatrichodes Meyrick, 1914

Footnotes

References 

 See also Gelechioidea talk page for comparison of some approaches to gelechioid systematics and taxonomy.
  (2008): Australian Faunal Directory – Oecophorinae. Version of 9 October 2008. Retrieved 24 April 2010.
  (2009): Gelechioidea. Version 2.1, 22 December 2009. Retrieved 22 April 2010.
  (2009): Lepidoptera and Some Other Life Forms  Oecophorinae. Version of 20 August 2009. Retrieved 22 April 2010.

 
Oecophoridae
Moth subfamilies